The Trans-Atlantic Exoplanet Survey, or TrES, used three 4-inch (10 cm) telescopes located at Lowell Observatory, Palomar Observatory, and Teide Observatory to locate exoplanets. It was made using the network of small, relatively inexpensive telescopes designed to look specifically for planets orbiting bright stars using the transit method. The array used 4-inch Schmidt telescopes having CCD cameras and automated search routines. The survey was created by David Charbonneau of the Center for Astrophysics, Timothy Brown of the National Center for Atmospheric Research, and Edward Dunham of Lowell Observatory.

The TrES survey is no longer operational.

Discoveries
The TrES project discovered a total of five planets in its years of operation. All were discovered using the transit method. Note that the discovery papers do not use the "b" suffix typically used in extrasolar planet designations. While forms with and without the b are used in the literature, the table here uses the designations assigned by the discoverers.

See also
TrES light curves of the Kepler field are available at the NASA Exoplanet Archive
 List of extrasolar planets

Similar exoplanet discovery projects
 XO Telescope or XO
 HATNet Project or HAT
 SuperWASP or WASP
 Kilodegree Extremely Little Telescope or KELT
 Next-Generation Transit Survey or NGTS

Exoplanet hunting spacecraft
 COROT is an ESA spacecraft launched December 2006.
 Kepler Mission is a NASA spacecraft launched March 2009.

References

External links
 http://www.space.com/scienceastronomy/070806_largest_exoplanet.html
 

Astronomical observatories
Exoplanet search projects by small telescope